The General Terminus and Glasgow Harbour Railway was authorised on 3 July 1846 and it opened, in part, in December 1848.

Its main function was intended to be the transportation of coal from collieries and Lanarkshire and Ayrshire, other railways, to a coal depot on the south bank of the River Clyde.

It linked the Polloc and Govan Railway with the Glasgow and Paisley Joint Railway, the Glasgow, Paisley, Kilmarnock and Ayr Railway, the Glasgow, Barrhead and Kilmarnock Joint Railway and the Clydesdale Junction Railway.

On 24 July 1854 parts of the line were vested with the Caledonian Railway; and final amalgamation occurred on 29 June 1865.

In the 1921 Railway Grouping it became part of the London, Midland and Scottish Railway (LMS).

The route
From its terminus at the River Clyde, the General Terminus and Glasgow Harbour Railway proceeded to Scotland Street Junction, where one branch crossed under the Glasgow and Paisley Joint Railway to join the City Union Line at Port Eglinton Junction. The other branch crossed under both the Glasgow and Paisley Joint Railway and the Paisley Canal Line; before splitting at Terminus Junction. One branch joined the Glasgow, Barrhead and Neilston Direct Railway and the Cathcart District Railway at Muirhouse Central Junction, the other branch passed through one of the Eglinton Street Tunnels and joined the Polloc and Govan Railway.

Expansion under British Railways
In 1954, as part of their development of their Ravenscraig steelworks near Motherwell, Colvilles Ltd and British Railways began installing new wharfage and facilities at General Terminus Quay. This was to allow the simultaneously unloading of two large ships carrying bulk iron ore. The ships were designed to hold 12,000 tons (12,200 tonnes) of iron ore.

Iron ore was to be transported, in bulk, by railway, from the River Clyde to the Lanarkshire steel works at, Motherwell. In March 1949, forward plans by Colvilles suggested that the General Terminus Quay ore handling facility would be handling two million tons of basic iron ore per year. 1,020,000 tons per year for the Clyde Iron Works and 980,000 tons for Ravenscraig steelworks. In 1954, Scotland imported 1,436,000 tons (1,460,000 tonnes) of iron ore, mainly from Sweden, North Africa, and Newfoundland.

Run down and redevelopment
The opening of the deep water Hunterston Ore Terminal, near West Kilbride, in the early 1970s led to The General Terminus Quay ceasing to handle this traffic and the ore handling equipment was demolished in the early 1980s.

A large area of the river frontage, including part of Windmillcroft Quay, Springfield Quay, General Terminus Quay, Mavisbank Quay and Princes Dock, was cleared in the early 1980s. Mavisbank Quay and the mostly infilled Princes Dock area was used to host the 1988 Glasgow Garden Festival. The former Glasgow Garden Festival site was relatively quickly redeveloped after the end of the six month festival; however the General Terminus Quay site was left vacant. It has since been used for housing and nearly all traces of the railway line have been removed between the River Clyde and its passage under the Glasgow and Paisley Joint Railway.

References

Notes

Sources
 
 
 Cunnison, J. and Gilfillan, J.B.S., (1958). The City of Glasgow (The Third Statistical Account of Scotland, Volume V). Glasgow: William Collins Sons & Co. Ltd.
 
 Little, M., (1979). Greater Glasgow's Railway Network. In: Scottish Transport, 33, Scottish Tramway Museum Society. ISSN 0048-9808.
 Payne, Peter L. (1979). Colvilles and the Scottish Steel Industry. Oxford: Oxford University Press. .
 Smith, W.A.C (compiler). and Thomas, John (Introduction), (not dated, but pre-1982). Rails Around GLASGOW. Scottish Steam Railtours Group (printed in Paisley).
 Thomas, John (1971).  Scotland: The Lowlands and the Borders (A Regional History of the Railways of Great Britain'', Volume 6). Newton Abbott: David & Charles. .

External links
 RAILSCOT on General Terminus and Glasgow Harbour Railway

Closed railway lines in Scotland
Early Scottish railway companies
Caledonian Railway
Pre-grouping British railway companies
Transport in Glasgow
Railway companies established in 1846
Railway lines opened in 1848
Railway companies disestablished in 1865
Standard gauge railways in Scotland
1846 establishments in Scotland